San Pedro de Zamudia is a Spanish village of the municipality of Morales de Valverde, located in the province of Zamora, in the autonomous community of Castile and León. As of 2017, it had a population of 58.

Overview
It is busiest during the summer months, when people come from other surrounding areas to the town, where they might have grown up or have family from there.

In San Pedro existed a convent for both nuns and monks. The present church is located within a very fertile lot of land where agriculture exists. The outside of the church is one of the more significant points in the espadaña (bell-gable), and the interior, as it could not be another way, has its larger altarpiece and a baptismal.

The result of this, is that the houses are very sunny. The layout is very irregular, without any type of urban planning. When not existing stone quarries, the traditional houses are of marinates.

Geography
San Pedro de Zamudia and the Valverde Valley is located in the northeast of the province of Zamora. It belongs to the Judicial Party of Benavente, which is about 20 km away. It is 67 km far from Zamora and 260 to Madrid.

The village has a small and very plain area. To the south, the Castrón river flows and crosses the Valverde Valley. The lowest part of the area, along the shore of the Castrón, is about 710m and at its highest of about 780m at the mount. The land is sedimentary and basically farmland.

Demographics

See also
Sandin
List of municipalities in Zamora

References

External links
 San Pedro de Zamudia info site
 Map and infos about San Pedro de Zamudia (Pueblos de España)
Photos of San Pedro de Zamudia

Populated places in the Province of Zamora